Sam Anderson (born April 2, 1947) is an American actor. He is best known for his character roles such as Sam Gorpley on Perfect Strangers, Holland Manners on Angel, dentist Bernard Nadler on Lost and in film, as the principal in Forrest Gump.

Early life
Anderson was born in Wahpeton, North Dakota. He received a Master of Arts degree in American literature and creative writing at the University of North Dakota and the University of Wisconsin. During the 1970s, he taught drama at Antelope Valley College in Lancaster, California.

Career
Anderson is best known for his roles as mailroom supervisor Mr. Gorpley on Perfect Strangers, the lawyer Holland Manners on the first two seasons of Angel and as Bernard on Lost. He notably played the school principal in Forrest Gump. He is also known as the assistant manager of the Hotel Royale in Star Trek: The Next Generation episode "The Royale", and as Mike Seaver's adversarial Principal DeWitt on Growing Pains. In addition, he was one of the recurring actors on various episodes of WKRP in Cincinnati, playing various roles, including an immigration officer in the episode "The Americanization of Ivan". Anderson has guest-starred in Season 8 of NCIS as Walter Carmichael, a middle school teacher whose classroom becomes a crime scene where one of his students is kidnapped.

Filmography

Film

Television

Awards and nominations
Ovation Awards
2019: Nominated for Lead Actor in a Play for the role of Ichabod Banks in the Road Theatre Company production of The Bird and Mr. Banks

References

External links

20th-century American male actors
21st-century American male actors
American male film actors
American male television actors
Antelope Valley College alumni
Educators from North Dakota
Living people
Male actors from North Dakota
People from Wahpeton, North Dakota
University of North Dakota alumni
1947 births